- Andhra Pradesh Lokayukta is formed as the  parliamentary ombudsman by the Government of Andhra Pradesh under the Andhra Pradesh Lokayukta and Upa-Lokayuktas Act, 83. Its institution acts as the high-level statutory functionary for the state of Andhra Pradesh and created independent of the governing political and public administration to address the public grievances against the state government and its administration. It came into force with effect from 1st November'83. It functions as a public instrument against corruption and other malpractices by public servants and government authorities of the state. 

A Lokayukta of the state is appointed to office by the state Governor after consulting the committee consisting of State Chief Minister, Speaker of Legislative Assembly, Leader of Opposition, Chairman of Legislative Council and Leader of Opposition of Legislative Council and will serve the period of five years.

History and administration 
The institution of Lokayukta has been set up in the state of Andhra Pradesh in 1983. through its Lokayukta Act. 

In 2014 Andhra Pradesh was bifurcated into two states, Andhra Pradesh and Telangana.

The Assembly of the new state of Andhra Pradesh approved that in addition to only serving Chief Justices or sitting judges even retired Chief Justices or retired Justices can be considered to be eligible for appointment for the position as the State Lokayukta. This was done by passing the amended Andhra Pradesh Lokayukta Amendment Bill,2019. 

Lokayukta of Andhra Pradesh is administered by its Registrar who is also its head of department. Its administrative system has four branches, namely  Administration, Judicial, Legal and Investigation.

The state Lokayukta is currently operating from the Government Building situated in  Kurnool, Andhra Pradesh.

Due to the rapid spread of COVID-19 cases, the Lokayukta of Andhra Pradesh asked the petitioners and government employees to submit petitions, reports online or by post.

Notable cases 
 The Institution received 448 complaints in 15 days between 15th September 2019 and 30th September 2019.
 In one of the landmark judgements the Lokayukta after appointment also ordered a series of strict measures on organised loan syndicates in co-operative banks in the state.
 In 2013, the Institution observed that one of the traditional medicines administered by private people should not be supported by the State Government as it does not have a scientific value.
 In one of its observations in year 2021, the institution expressed that the employees of medical, health and treasury offices combined and created 61 dummy people who are not physically available and fraudulently booking salaries in their names for several years.

Appointments and tenure 
The Governor of the state appointed Justice P Lakshmana Reddy as the first Lokayukta of bifurcated Andhra Pradesh on 15 September 2019. 

Following is the list and tenure of various Lokayuktas of the state:

Powers 
The institution has powers to investigate and prosecute any government official or public servants who are covered by the act and abuses his authority for his self interest or causes hurt to anyone or any action done intentionally or following corrupt practices negatively impacting the state or individual

Related articles 

The Lokpal and Lokayuktas Act, 2013

Goa Lokayukta

 Delhi Lokayukta
 
Chhattisgarh Lokayog

Gujarat Lokayukta

References

External links 
 Official website

Lokayuktas
Government of Andhra Pradesh
1983 establishments in Andhra Pradesh
Government agencies established in 1983